Charles van der Stappen (also Karl van der Stappen; 19 September 1843 – 21 October 1910), was a Belgian sculptor, born in Saint-Josse-ten-Noode.

Life 
Educated at the Académie Royale des Beaux-Arts in Brussels (1859–1868), van der Stappen's contribution to the Brussels Salon was "The Faun's Toilet" of 1869, and thereafter he began to produce work of a high and novel order in every class of sculpture, and soon, along with Paul de Vigne, became recognized as the leader of the section of the new Belgian school of sculpture which infused models derived from Greek and Roman models and the art of the Italian Renaissance with naturalistic detail and fleeting action.

His best-known funeral monuments are those to Alexandre Gendebien (1874) and Baron Coppens, at Sheel (1875). His statues include William the Silent, set up at the Petit Sablon Square, and two in the Brussels Museum, The Man with the Sword, and "The Sphinx". The bronze group Ompdrailles was acquired by the Belgian government (1892).

In 1893 the sculptor began his collaboration with Constantin Meunier for the elaborate decoration of the Botanical Garden of Brussels, coordinating many other sculptors for the production of some 52 sculptures for its grounds.  The result of the connection may be seen in the group The Builders of Cities which is strongly imbued with the feeling and types of Meunier's sympathetic figures of workers.

Among his students were Ilse Twardowski-Conrat, Helene Zelezny-Scholz, Rik Wouters, Paul Du Bois, João Turin, and Victor Rousseau, who would succeed him as director of the Académie Royale des Beaux-Arts.

His student Ilse Twardowski-Conrat received the commission for his funerary monument after he died in 1910.

Work 
 Decoration on the Palais des Postes, Brussels, 1872
 Statues for the Alhambra Theatre, Brussels, 1874
 Caryatides for the house of the Ghent architect Louis de Curte (1817–1891), 1874 
 Pediment sculpture Orchestration, one of the five pediment sculptures at the Royal Conservatory of Brussels, for architect Jean-Pierre Cluysenaer, 1875
 Noble bronze group, The Teaching of Art, on the facade of the Palace of Fine Arts, Brussels, 1880
 Bronze of the painter Émile Sacré which was presented at the exhibition of Les XX in 1884
 St. Michael, for the Gothic Hall of the Town Hall, Brussels, 1885
 La Mort d'Ompdrailles monument, Brussels, depicting characters from novelist Leon Cladel, with base by architect Victor Horta, 1895–1897
 Bronze monument to painter Théodore Baron (1840–1899), Namur, 1903
 Figures of Antwerp and Liège for the arches of the Cinquantenaire, circa 1905

Gallery

References

Attribution:

Sources
 Charles van der Stappen, by Camille Lemonnier; 
 Les Artistes belges contemporains, by E.L. de Taye; 
 The Renaissance of Sculpture in Belgium, by OG Destrée (London, 1895).

1843 births
1910 deaths
People from Saint-Josse-ten-Noode
Belgian architectural sculptors
20th-century Belgian sculptors
19th-century Belgian sculptors
19th-century Belgian male artists
Académie Royale des Beaux-Arts alumni
Academic staff of the Académie Royale des Beaux-Arts
20th-century Belgian male artists